Priority is a fundamental principle of modern botanical nomenclature and zoological nomenclature. Essentially, it is the principle of recognising the first valid application of a name to a plant or animal. There are two aspects to this: 
 The first formal scientific name published for a plant or animal taxon shall be the name that is to be used, called the valid name in zoology and correct name in botany (principle of synonymy).
 Once a name has been used, no subsequent publication of that name for another taxon shall be valid (zoology) or validly published (botany) (principle of homonymy).  
Note that nomenclature for botany and zoology is independent, and the rules of priority regarding homonyms operate within each discipline but not between them.

There are formal provisions for making exceptions to the principle of priority under each of the Codes. If an archaic or obscure prior name is discovered for an established taxon, the current name can be declared a nomen conservandum (botany) or conserved name (zoology), and so conserved against the prior name. Conservation may be avoided entirely in zoology as these names may fall in the formal category of nomen oblitum. Similarly, if the current name for a taxon is found to have an archaic or obscure prior homonym, the current name can be declared a nomen protectum (zoology) or the older name suppressed (nomen rejiciendum, botany).

History
The principle of priority has not always been in place. When Carl Linnaeus laid the foundations of modern nomenclature, he offered no recognition of prior names. The botanists who followed him were just as willing to overturn Linnaeus's names. The first sign of recognition of priority came in 1813, when A. P. de Candolle laid out some principles of good nomenclatural practice. He favoured retaining prior names, but left wide scope for overturning poor prior names.

In botany
During the 19th century, the principle gradually came to be accepted by almost all botanists, but debate continued to rage over the conditions under which the principle might be ignored. Botanists on one side of the debate argued that priority should be universal and without exception. This would have meant a one-off major disruption as countless names in current usage were overturned in favour of archaic prior names. In 1891, Otto Kuntze, one of the most vocal proponents of this position, did just that, publishing over 30000 new combinations in his Revisio Generum Plantarum. He then followed with further such publications in 1893, 1898 and 1903. His efforts, however, were so disruptive that they appear to have benefited his opponents. By the 1900s, the need for a mechanism for the conservation of names was widely accepted, and details of such a mechanism were under discussion. The current system of "modified priority" was essentially put in place at the Cambridge Congress of 1930.

In zoology
The Principle of Priority is one of the guiding principles of the International Code of Zoological Nomenclature, defined by Article 23. There are exceptions: another name may be given precedence by any provision of the Code or by any ruling of the Commission. It is a fundamental guiding precept that preserves the stability of biological nomenclature. It was first formulated in 1842 by  a committee appointed by the British Association to consider the rules of zoological nomenclature; the committee's report was written by Hugh Edwin Strickland.

Examples
 In 1855, John Edward Gray published the name Antilocapra anteflexa for a new species of pronghorn, based on a pair of horns. However, it is now thought that his specimen belonged to an unusual individual of an existing species, Antilocapra americana, with a name published by George Ord in 1815. The older name, by Ord, takes priority; with Antilocapra anteflexa becoming a junior synonym.
 In 1856, Johann Jakob Kaup published the name Leptocephalus brevirostris for a new species of eel. However, it was realized in 1893 that the organism described by Kaup was in fact the juvenile form of the European eel (see eel life history for the full story). The European eel was named Muraena anguilla by Carl Linnaeus in 1758. So Muraena anguilla is the name to be used for the species, and Leptocephalus brevirostris must be considered as a junior synonym and not be used. Today the European eel is classified in the genus Anguilla (Garsault, 1764,) so its currently used name is Anguilla anguilla (Linnaeus, 1758).

Mechanics
In botany and horticulture, the principle of priority applies to names at the rank of family and below. When moves are made to another genus or from one species to another, the "final epithet" of the name is combined with the new genus name, with any adjustments necessary for Latin grammar, for example:
 When Festuca subgenus Schedonorus was moved to the genus Lolium, its name became Lolium subgenus Schedonorus.
 Xiphion danfordiae Baker was moved to Juno danfordiae (Baker) Klatt and to Iridodictyum danfordiae (Baker) Nothdurft.
 Orthocarpus castillejoides var. humboldtiensis D.D. Keck was moved to Castilleja ambigua var. humboldtiensis (D.D. Keck) J.M. Egger.
 When Caladenia alata was moved to the genus Petalochilus, the grammatical gender of the Latin words required a change in ending of the species epithet to the masculine form, Petalochilus alatus.

In zoology, the principle of priority applies to names between the rank of superfamily and subspecies (not to varieties, which are below the rank of subspecies). Also unlike in botany, the authorship of new combinations is not tracked, and only the original authority is ever cited. Example:
 A.A. Girault published a description of a wasp, as Epentastichus fuscus, on 10 December 1913, and on 29 December 1913, he published a description of a related species, as Neomphaloides fusca. Eventually, both of these species were later transferred to the same genus, Aprostocetus, at which point they both would have become Aprostocetus fuscus (Girault, 1913), except that the one published 19 days later was the junior homonym, and its name was replaced with Aprostocetus fuscosus Bouček, 1988.

See also
Kew Rule

References

Zoological nomenclature
Botanical nomenclature